C-sharp, C♯, or C# may refer to:

 C♯ (musical note)
 C-sharp major, a musical scale
 C-sharp minor, a musical scale
 C# (programming language), a programming language pronounced as "C-sharp"